Titawi is a village in Muzaffarnagar within the Muzaffarnagar district of Uttar Pradesh, India. As of 2006, it had a population of approximately 8,000 within 1,000 households. It is some 15 km from the district headquarters.

Economy
Titawi is developing as an industrial village. Most notable is the Titawi sugar mill. It is conveniently near Baghra, which grows sugarcane. Titawi provides a bus terminal for nearby villages.

References

Cities and towns in Muzaffarnagar district